Wolgwang Water's Edge Park is a park that is located in Daegu Dalseo-gu, South Korea.
The area of park is 40,163 m2. It opened in 2000 April.
As there are a lot of roses around the park, a rose festival is held in spring.

References
http://100.naver.com/100.nhn?docid=763277

Parks in Daegu
Dalseo District
2000 establishments in South Korea